Wagler's worm lizard (Amphisbaena vermicularis) is a worm lizard species in the family Amphisbaenidae. It is endemic to Brazil and Bolivia.

References

Amphisbaena (lizard)
Reptiles described in 1824
Taxa named by Johann Georg Wagler